Shirak or Širak may refer to:

Places 

Shirak Province, administrative division of Armenia
Shirak, Armenia, village in Shirak Province, Armenia
Shanbarak, village in Qazvin Province, Iran, formerly known as Shīrak
Shirag, village in South Khorasan Province, Iran, also called Shīrak
Shirak Airport, international airport in Gyumri, Armenia
Shirak State University, state university in Gyumri, Armenia
Shirak Poghosyan (born 1969), Armenian long jumper
 Deh Shirak
 Shirak Plain, a plain located in the Armenian Plateau

Other uses 
FC Shirak, football club from Gyumri, Armenia
Shirak (periodical), Lebanese Armenian literary publication

See also 
 Sirak (disambiguation)